Brittany Hochevar (born May 26, 1981) is an American female volleyball and beach volleyball player.

Career
Her hometown is Fowler, Colorado. 
She was part of the United States women's national volleyball team, playing as an opposite hitter and setter.
She participated in the 2004 Women's Pan-American Volleyball Cup.

As a beach volleyball player, she plays as a defender. She played together with Lisa Rutledge in 2011 and with Lauren Fendrick in 2013. Hochevar and Fendrick were eliminated in the quarter final at the 2013 Beach Volleyball World Championships.

References

External links
 
 
 
 

1981 births
Living people
American women's volleyball players
American women's beach volleyball players
Volleyball players at the 2003 Pan American Games
Pan American Games bronze medalists for the United States
Place of birth missing (living people)
Pan American Games medalists in volleyball
Opposite hitters
Setters (volleyball)
Beach volleyball defenders
Long Beach State Beach women's volleyball players
Galatasaray S.K. (women's volleyball) players
Medalists at the 2003 Pan American Games
21st-century American women